Vilmos Tkálecz ( January 8, 1894 – May 27, 1950) was a Hungarian-Slovenian schoolmaster and politician who served as governor of the short-lived Republic of Prekmurje in 1919.

Tkálecz was born on January 8, 1894, in Turnišče, Prekmurje, in Zala County of the Kingdom of Hungary. His father István Tkálecz was an innkeeper, and his mother was Mária Hochhoffer, who was of German descent. In 1917, he enlisted in the army and was sent to Russia. After World War I, he worked as a schoolteacher in Črenšovci, near Lendava.

Under the Hungarian Soviet Republic, Tkálecz was an assistant to the clerk Béla Obál while he stayed in Murska Sobota.

On May 29, 1919, Tkálecz declared Prekmurje a republic. On June 6, the Hungarian Red Army was sent to Murska Sobota and overthrew the state. Tkálecz went into exile to Austria sometime during 1920, and later found work as a teacher in Nagykarácsony, Hungary, where he remained for many years. He died in Budapest in 1950. After 1929 he changed his name to Vilmos Tarcsay. In 1939 wrote a Prekmurje Slovene textbook called Vend-szlovenszka kniga cstenya.

See also
 Republic of Prekmurje
 List of Slovenian politicians

1894 births
1950 deaths
People from Turnišče
Slovenian politicians
Slovenian writers and poets in Hungary
Hungarian Slovenes
Hungarian educators
People from Črenšovci